Ana Crysna da Silva Romero (born May 4, 1988) is an Angolan swimmer, who specialized in sprint freestyle events. She represented her nation Angola at the 2008 Summer Olympics, placing herself among the top 70 swimmers in the 50 m freestyle.

Romero was invited by FINA to compete as a 20-year-old swimmer for the Angolan team in the women's 50 m freestyle at the 2008 Summer Olympics in Beijing. Swimming in heat five, she threw down an Angolan national record time and a lifetime best of 29.06 seconds to round out the field in last place.  Romero, however, failed to advance into the semi-finals, as she placed sixty-fifth overall out of ninety-two swimmers in the prelims.

References

External links
 

1988 births
Living people
Angolan female swimmers
Olympic swimmers of Angola
Swimmers at the 2008 Summer Olympics
Angolan female freestyle swimmers
Sportspeople from Luanda